|}

The Chartwell Fillies' Stakes is a Group 3 flat horse race in Great Britain open to fillies and mares aged three years or older. It is run over a distance of 7 furlongs at Lingfield Park in May.

History
The event is named after Chartwell, the principal home of Sir Winston Churchill. The property is located several miles to the north-east of Lingfield.

The race was established in 1994, and the first running was won by Branston Abby. It initially held Listed status, and was promoted to Group 3 level in 2004.

Records

Most successful horse:
 no horse has won this race more than once

Leading jockey (3 wins):
 Pat Eddery – Supercal (1997), Nanoushka (1998), Presto Vento (2003)

Leading trainer (3 wins):
 Richard Hannon Sr. – Nanoushka (1998), Presto Vento (2003), Lucky Spin (2005)

Winners

See also
 Horse racing in Great Britain
 List of British flat horse races

References

 Racing Post:

 galopp-sieger.de – Chartwell Fillies' Stakes.
 ifhaonline.org – International Federation of Horseracing Authorities – Chartwell Fillies' Stakes (2019).
 pedigreequery.com – Chartwell Fillies' Stakes – Lingfield.

Mile category horse races for fillies and mares
Lingfield Park Racecourse
Flat races in Great Britain
1994 establishments in England
Recurring sporting events established in 1994